K3 Bengeltjes is the fourth movie with K3. It was directed by Bart Van Leemputten. It is the first movie with new member Josje Huisman.

Plot

The girls of K3 are excited, because their cousins will come visit them for the weekend. But there not excited anymore, because their cousins are obnoxious. They break everything in their apartment. Karen calls them terrorists. Angel Manuel sends his assistant Tuur to go take K3's cousins. Tuur made a mistake and brought K3 and makes them into little Rascals . K3 must well behave for 24 hours, but that is not that easy as you think.

Cast

Voices

Soundtrack

The title song of the movie Waar zijn die Engeltjes (En.: "Where Are the Angels") came out in July 2012.

 Waar zijn die Engeltjes
 Leugentje Leugentje
 Niet Normaal
 Gigaleuke Dag
 Jurkje

References

2012 films
Dutch-language films